Anthony Michael "Tony" Atkins AM (born 4 February 1943 in Elwood, Victoria) is an Australian medical doctor. He was awarded Member of the Order of Australia in 1987 in recognition of service to international relations, particularly in the field of famine relief and agricultural development in Africa.

Early life and education
Atkins attended Elwood Central School and after receiving the Albert Jacka Scholarship, he completed his secondary education at Wesley College, Melbourne in 1959 aged sixteen.  He then graduated MBBS, University of Melbourne, in 1965 and PhD, Monash University, in 1972, also completing Graduate Diploma in International Health, Monash University, 2002.

Career
In 1966/67 he was Resident Medical Officer at the Alfred Hospital in Melbourne. From 1968 to 1974 he was employed at the Monash University Medical School.  From 1973 to 1980 he served with the Africa Committee for the Rehabilitation of Southern Sudan in Juba and Darfur.  Between 1980 and 1987 he worked for World Vision International, based in California and East Africa. Throughout this period he oversaw many major relief and rehabilitation programs in various countries. During the severe famine of 1984-85 in Ethiopia, Dr Atkins was Director of the relief program provided by World Vision International, based in Addis Ababa.

In recent years, Atkins has worked in Aboriginal Health Services in Western Australia and Queensland as well as a continuing role as a general medical practitioner in Berwick, Victoria.

References

1943 births
Living people
Australian general practitioners
People educated at Wesley College (Victoria)
Melbourne Medical School alumni
Monash University alumni

Members of the Order of Australia
Australian humanitarians
People from Elwood, Victoria
Medical doctors from Melbourne